Nyctemera luctuosa is a moth of the family Erebidae first described by Samuel Constantinus Snellen van Vollenhoven in 1863. It is found in Papua New Guinea, Australia and the Philippines. The habitat consists of mountainous areas.

The forewings are black with a broad irregular diagonal white band and a small white spot near the base. The hindwings are white with broad black margins. Adults are variable in both pattern and ground colour. This is a day-flying species.

The larvae feed on various plants, including Senecio scandens.

Subspecies
Nyctemera luctuosa luctuosa (Batjan)
Nyctemera luctuosa drucei (Swinhoe, 1903) (New Guinea, New Hebrides, Australia)
Nyctemera luctuosa galbana (Swinhoe, 1892) (Sebu)
Nyctemera luctuosa instructa Walker, 1864 (New Guinea)
Nyctemera luctuosa onetha (Swinhoe, 1901) (New Britain)
Nyctemera luctuosa syrnia (Swinhoe, 1903) (Fergusson Islands)

References

Nyctemerina
Moths described in 1863
Taxa named by Samuel Constantinus Snellen van Vollenhoven